was the lead ship of the Nokaze sub-class, an improvement to the  1st class destroyers built for the Imperial Japanese Navy following World War I. Advanced for their time, these ships served as first-line destroyers through the 1930s, but were considered obsolescent by the start of the Pacific War.

History
Construction of the large-sized Minekaze-class destroyers was authorized as part of the Imperial Japanese Navy's 8-4 Fleet Program from fiscal 1917 with nine vessels, and fiscal 1918 with an additional six vessels. However, the final three vessels in the fiscal 1918 were built to a different design and have a different enough silhouette that many authors consider them to be a separate class. Nokaze, built at the Maizuru Naval Arsenal was laid down on 16 April 1921, launched on 1 October 1921 and commissioned on 31 March 1922.

In 1938-1939, this Division was assigned to patrols of the northern and central China coastlines in support of Japanese combat operations in the Second Sino-Japanese War

World War II history
At the time of the attack on Pearl Harbor, Nokaze was based at the Ōminato Guard District in northern Japan, and was assigned to patrols of the Hokkaidō and Chishima Islands coastlines.

During the Battle of Midway in May 1942, Nokaze was assigned to the reserve force for the Aleutian Islands Operation, which did not leave Japanese waters. Afterwards, it returned to patrol and escort duties based out of Ōminato through July 1943, when it was assigned temporarily to the IJN 5th Fleet for the mission to evacuate surviving Japanese forces from "Operation Cottage" (the evacuation of Kiska). Nokaze continued to be based at Ōminato for patrol and escort in northern waters until January 1945.

In January 1945, Nokaze was reassigned to the Combined Fleet, departing from Moji on 26 January with Convoy HI-91 bound for Singapore. However, Nokaze was ordered to Mako, where it was to join the destroyer screen for the battleships , and  during Operation Kita. However, on 15 February, there was a change of plans, and Nokaze was ordered to proceed instead to Singapore on its own.

The ship exploded and sank, with 209 killed. Kamikaze rescued 21 survivors, including its captain, Lieutenant Commander Tarō Ebihara. Nokaze was the last of 39 Japanese destroyers to fall victim to United States Navy submarines during the war.

On 10 April 1945 Nokaze was removed from navy list.

Notes

References

External links

Minekaze-class destroyers
Ships built by Maizuru Naval Arsenal
1921 ships
Second Sino-Japanese War naval ships of Japan
World War II destroyers of Japan
Ships sunk by American submarines
World War II shipwrecks in the South China Sea
Maritime incidents in February 1945
Naval magazine explosions